Hashtgerd (also known as Ashjird, Hashtjerd, and Hashtjird) is a city the Central District of Savojbolagh County, Alborz province, Iran, serving as the capital of the county. At the National Census of 2006, the city had a population of 45,332 in 12,122 households. At the latest census of 2016, it had a population of 55,640 in 17,203 households.

Hashtgerd includes several nearby archeological mounds, known collectively as "Ozbaki."  These sites, which have been actively excavated for several decades, include several mounds or Tepes, including Doshan Tapeh. Ozbaki includes remains of ancient settlements dating back to the 7th millennium BC through 1400 BC. These settlements include those inhabited by "Grey earthenware" Aryans and the Medians.

A park called the Statue Park has been built in a green area across a valley in Hashtgerd. In this park, 12 busts of notable Iranians are made by different Iranian artists.

Hashtgerd possesses an industrial city, the Hashtgerd International Studios, a hydroponic farming complex, a Center for Agricultural Research and Nuclear Medicine, and the Iranian Garden Museum. Hashtgerd is the last stop on Line 5, a suburban commuter line of Tehran's metro.

External links
 Case Study Hashtgerd New Town

References 

Savojbolagh County

Districts of Alborz Province

Populated places in Alborz Province

Populated places in Savojbolagh County

Planned cities in Iran